The 1972 United States presidential election in Maryland was held on November 7, 1972, as part of the 1972 United States presidential election. Both the Democratic and Republican (Sargent Shriver and Spiro Agnew, respectively) Vice Presidential nominees were from Maryland.

Maryland was won by incumbent President Richard Nixon of California and Vice President Spiro Agnew (a Maryland native), winning 61.26% of the vote to George McGovern and Shriver's 37.36%. Nixon won every county-equivalent in the state except Baltimore City. He won over 77% of the vote in Carroll County, and over 70% in 9 counties overall. This is the last time Prince George's County has voted Republican in a presidential election, and the last of only 7 occasions since the emergence of the Republican Party that Maryland has voted more Republican than the nation as a whole. As of 2020, this remains the strongest performance by a Republican in Maryland. This also marks the last time the Democratic candidate was held to under 60% of the vote in Baltimore City, as it would vote for that party in increasingly large margins since this election.

Of his three presidential campaigns, this is the only time in which Nixon carried the home state of his running mate. Nixon failed to carry Maryland in 1968 and in 1960 did not carry Massachusetts, the home state of his then running mate Henry Cabot Lodge Jr.

Results

Results by county

Counties that flipped from Democratic to Republican
Calvert
Montgomery

See also
 United States presidential elections in Maryland
 1972 United States presidential election
 1972 United States elections

Notes

References 

Maryland
1972
Presidential